This is a list of electoral divisions and wards in the ceremonial county of Hampshire in South East England. All changes since the re-organisation of local government following the passing of the Local Government Act 1972 are shown. The number of councillors elected for each electoral division or ward is shown in brackets.

County council

Hampshire
Electoral Divisions from 1 April 1974 (first election 12 April 1973) to 7 May 1981:

Electoral Divisions from 7 May 1981 to 5 May 2005:

Electoral Divisions from 5 May 2005 to 4 May 2017:

Electoral Divisions from 4 May 2017 to present:

Unitary authority councils

Portsmouth
Wards from 1 April 1974 (first election 7 June 1973) to 5 May 1983:

Wards from 5 May 1983 to 2 May 2002:

Wards from 2 May 2002 to present:

Southampton
Wards from 1 April 1974 (first election 7 June 1973) to 3 May 1979:

Wards from 3 May 1979 to 2 May 2002:

Wards from 2 May 2002 to present:

District councils

Basingstoke and Deane
Wards from 1 April 1974 (first election 7 June 1973) to 6 May 1976:

Wards from 6 May 1976 to 7 May 1992:

Wards from 7 May 1992 to 2 May 2002:

Wards from 2 May 2002 to 1 May 2008:

Wards from 1 May 2008 to 6 May 2021:

Wards from 6 May 2021 to present:

East Hampshire
Wards from 1 April 1974 (first election 7 June 1973) to 3 May 1979:

Wards from 3 May 1979 to 1 May 2003:

Wards from 1 May 2003 to 2 May 2019:

Wards from 2 May 2019 to present:

Eastleigh
Wards from 1 April 1974 (first election 7 June 1973) to 6 May 1976:

Wards from 6 May 1976 to 2 May 2002:

Wards from 2 May 2002 to 3 May 2018:

Wards from 3 May 2018 to present:

Fareham
Wards from 1 April 1974 (first election 7 June 1973) to 6 May 1976:

Wards from 6 May 1976 to 2 May 2002:

Wards from 2 May 2002 to present:

Gosport
Wards from 1 April 1974 (first election 7 June 1973) to 3 May 1979:

Wards from 3 May 1979 to 2 May 2002:

Wards from 2 May 2002 to 5 May 2022:

Wards from 5 May 2022:

Hart
Wards from 1 April 1974 (first election 7 June 1973) to 6 May 1976:

Wards from 6 May 1976 to 2 May 2002:

Wards from 2 May 2002 to 22 May 2014:

Wards from 22 May 2014 to present:

Havant
Wards from 1 April 1974 (first election 7 June 1973) to 6 May 1976:

Wards from 6 May 1976 to 2 May 2002:

Wards from 2 May 2002 to present:

New Forest
Wards from 1 April 1974 (first election 7 June 1973) to 6 May 1976:

Wards from 6 May 1976 to 1 May 2003:

Wards from 1 May 2003 to 2023:

† minor boundary changes in 2011

Wards from 2023:

Rushmoor
Wards from 1 April 1974 (first election 7 June 1973) to 3 May 1979:

Wards from 3 May 1979 to 2 May 2002:

Wards from 2 May 2002 to 3 May 2012:

Wards from 3 May 2012 to present:

Test Valley
Wards from 1 April 1974 (first election 7 June 1973) to 6 May 1976:

Wards from 6 May 1976 to 1 May 2003:

Wards from 1 May 2003 to 2 May 2019:

Wards from 2 May 2019 to present:

Winchester
Wards from 1 April 1974 (first election 7 June 1973) to 6 May 1976:

Wards from 6 May 1976 to 2 May 2002:

Wards from 2 May 2002 to 5 May 2016:

Wards from 5 May 2016 to present:

Electoral wards by constituency

Aldershot
Blackwater and Hawley, Cove and Southwood, Empress, Fernhill, Frogmore and Darby Green, Grange, Heron Wood, Knellwood, Manor Park, Mayfield, North Town, Rowhill, St. John's, St. Mark's, Wellington, Westheath.

Basingstoke
Basing, Brighton Hill North, Brighton Hill South, Brookvale and Kings Furlong, Buckskin, Chineham, Eastrop, Grove, Hatch Warren and Beggarwood, Kempshott, Norden, Popley East, Popley West, Rooksdown, South Ham, Winklebury.

East Hampshire
Alton Amery, Alton Ashdell, Alton Eastbrooke, Alton Westbrooke, Alton Whitedown, Alton Wooteys, Binstead and Bentley, Bramshott and Liphook, Downland, East Meon, Four Marks and Medstead, Froxfield and Steep, Grayshott, Headley, Holybourne and Froyle, Lindford, Liss, Petersfield Bell Hill, Petersfield Causeway, Petersfield Heath, Petersfield Rother, Petersfield St Marys, Petersfield St Peters, Ropley and Tisted, Selborne, The Hangers and Forest, Whitehill Chase, Whitehill Deadwater, Whitehill Hogmoor, Whitehill Pinewood, Whitehill Walldown.

Eastleigh
Bishopstoke East, Bishopstoke West, Botley, Bursledon and Old Netley, Eastleigh Central, Eastleigh North, Eastleigh South, Fair Oak and Horton Heath, Hamble-le-Rice and Butlocks Heath, Hedge End Grange Park, Hedge End St John's, Hedge End Wildern, Netley Abbey, West End North, West End South.

Fareham
Fareham East, Fareham North, Fareham North-West, Fareham South, Fareham West, Locks Heath, Park Gate, Portchester East, Portchester West, Sarisbury, Titchfield, Titchfield Common, Warsash.

Gosport
Alverstoke, Anglesey, Bridgemary North, Bridgemary South, Brockhurst, Christchurch, Elson, Forton, Grange, Hardway, Hill Head, Lee East, Lee West, Leesland, Peel Common, Privett, Rowner and Holbrook, Stubbington, Town.

Havant
Barncroft, Battins, Bedhampton, Bondfields, Emsworth, Hayling East, Hayling West, Purbrook, St Faith's, Stakes, Warren Park.

Meon Valley
Bishops Waltham, Boarhunt and Southwick, Cheriton and Bishops Sutton, Clanfield and Finchdean, Cowplain, Denmead, Droxford, Soberton and Hambledon, Hart Plain, Horndean Catherington and Lovedean, Horndean Downs, Horndean Hazleton and Blendworth, Horndean Kings, Horndean Murray, Owslebury and Curdridge, Rowlands Castle, Shedfield, Swanmore and Newtown, Upper Meon Valley, Waterloo, Whiteley, Wickham.

New Forest East
Ashurst, Copythorne South and Netley Marsh, Boldre and Sway, Bramshaw, Copythorne North and Minstead, Brockenhurst and Forest South East, Butts Ash and Dibden Purlieu, Dibden and Hythe East, Fawley, Blackfield and Langley, Furzedown and Hardley, Holbury and North Blackfield, Hythe West and Langdown, Lyndhurst, Marchwood, Totton Central, Totton East, Totton North, Totton South, Totton West.

New Forest West
Barton, Bashley, Becton, Bransgore and Burley, Buckland, Downlands and Forest, Fernhill, Fordingbridge, Forest North West, Hordle, Lymington Town, Milford, Milton, Pennington, Ringwood East and Sopley, Ringwood North, Ringwood South.

North East Hampshire
Calleva, Church Crookham East, Church Crookham West, Crondall, Eversley, Fleet Central, Fleet Courtmoor, Fleet North, Fleet Pondtail, Fleet West, Hartley Wintney, Hook, Long Sutton, Odiham, Pamber, Sherborne St John, Upton Grey and The Candovers, Yateley East, Yateley North, Yateley West.

North West Hampshire
Alamein, Amport, Anna, Baughurst, Burghclere, Bourne Valley, Charlton, East Woodhay, Harroway, Highclere and Bourne, Kingsclere, Millway, Oakley and North Waltham, Overton, Laverstoke and Steventon, Penton Bellinger, St Mary's, Tadley North, Tadley South, Whitchurch, Winton.

Portsmouth North
Baffins, Copnor, Cosham, Drayton and Farlington, Hilsea, Nelson, Paulsgrove.

Portsmouth South
Central Southsea, Charles Dickens, Eastney and Craneswater, Fratton, Milton, St Jude, St Thomas.

Romsey and Southampton North
Abbey, Ampfield and Braishfield, Bassett, Blackwater, Broughton and Stockbridge, Chilworth, Nursling and Rownhams, Cupernham, Dun Valley, Harewood, Kings Somborne and Michelmersh, North Baddesley, Over Wallop, Romsey Extra, Swaythling, Tadburn, Valley Park.

Southampton, Itchen
Bargate, Bitterne, Bitterne Park, Harefield, Peartree, Sholing, Woolston.

Southampton, Test
Bevois, Coxford, Freemantle, Millbrook, Portswood, Redbridge, Shirley.

Winchester
Alresford & Itchen Valley, Badger Farm & Oliver's Battery, Chandler's Ford East, Chandler's Ford West, Colden Common & Twyford, Hiltingbury East, Hiltingbury West, St Barnabas, St Bartholomew, St Luke, St Michael, St Paul, The Worthys, Wonston & Micheldever.

See also
List of parliamentary constituencies in Hampshire

References

 
Hampshire